This is a list of notable clock towers in India.

List

References 

 
C
I
C